The many incarnations of the DC Comics superhero Green Lantern have appeared in numerous media over the years.

Dedicated media featuring Green Lantern primarily include: the 2012–2013 animated television series Green Lantern: The Animated Series, the 2011 live action film Green Lantern with accompanying video game Green Lantern: Rise of the Manhunters, and animated films Green Lantern: First Flight in 2009 and Green Lantern: Emerald Knights released in 2011.

Novels/audios
Green Lantern: Sleepers is a trilogy created by Christopher J. Priest and written by Mike Baron, Michael Ahn, and Priest. Each book focuses on a different Green Lantern—Kyle Rayner, Alan Scott, and Hal Jordan, respectively.

Pocket has published a series of Justice League of America novels. Of these, Exterminators by Christopher Golden includes Hal Jordan as part of the team, and Hero's Quest by Dennis O'Neil is a solo Green Lantern story.

All of these stories have been made into full-cast dramatizations released by GraphicAudio.

Television

Animation

The Superman/Aquaman Hour of Adventure
Hal Jordan was the featured character in a solo series which was part of The Superman/Aquaman Hour of Adventure (1967) as well as part of the Justice League segments. These would be the character's first animated appearances. Gerald Mohr is the voice of Green Lantern.

Super Friends
Hal Jordan is a supporting character in the various incarnations of Super Friends, voiced by Michael Rye.

Justice League
John Stewart is a member of the Justice League in Justice League, voiced by Phil LaMarr. In this series, Stewart's ring was initially constrained to permitting him to fly, generating a protective force field, creating walls, and firing energy blasts; this limitation was established as being due to Stewart's mindset, not an inherent limitation of the ring itself. After being berated by Katma Tui for his unimaginative use of the ring, Stewart has learned to generate complex tools and weapons. In a development not seen in any other version of the Green Lantern mythos, Stewart's eyes glow green when wearing his charged power ring. The glow fades when the ring runs out of power. The series has been inconsistent about the ring's effectiveness against yellow; Stewart is seen fighting Sinestro in one episode, and the yellow energy does not prove to be a significant problem for him, although in a later episode of Justice League Unlimited, Lex Luthor in Flash's body threw yellow Jell-O at him, breaking his force field. In the JL continuity, Stewart begins to develop an intimate relationship with Shayera Hol, and their feelings for each other persist even after the events of the episode "Starcrossed", and are slowly being rebuilt in the course of the Justice League Unlimited series (even though Stewart has at that time entered a relationship with Vixen), the result of which is John and Shayera's son, the future superhero Rex Stewart/Warhawk. In Justice League Unlimited, his appearance is slightly tweaked, having a bald head and goatee beard, and the green portions of his Lantern outfit now being mint green. Stewart maintains much of a soldier's attitude in his personal life, being stern and no-nonsense, which is somewhat offset by his relationship with the Flash, with whom he is very close despite their radically differing personalities. He is also a close friend of former U.S.M.C. comrade Rex Mason, and revealed in "Ancient History" to be a reincarnation of Bashari of ancient Egypt, where he was Princess Chay-Ara Hol's secret lover and killed by Hath-Set.

Other DCAU appearances
Kyle Rayner appears as Green Lantern in the Superman: The Animated Series episode "In Brightest Day...". This version is a Daily Planet artist recruited by Abin Sur, and fights Jordan's old enemy Sinestro. Guy Gardner makes a cameo as the mugger who steals Jimmy Olsen's camera. Rayner is voiced by Michael P. Greco.
Rayner is briefly mentioned in one episode of Justice League and appears attending Superman's funeral in "Hereafter". He later reappears in the Justice League Unlimited episode "The Return", being voiced by Will Friedle and bearing a far greater resemblance to his comics counterpart. Rayner's appearance (where he and the Corps unsuccessfully attempted to defend Oa from Amazo) finally explains why Stewart is the Green Lantern of Earth; Rayner had been stationed on Oa all along.
A character known as Scott Mason / Green Guardsman appears in the two-part Justice League episode "Legends", in which Stewart and several other members travel to a parallel universe. This other universe has its own superhero group, the Justice Guild of America, whose members are modeled on Golden Age versions of the Justice Society of America characters. Green Guardsman is an homage to the Golden Age Green Lantern. His power ring is unable to affect aluminum. The voice of the Green Guardsman is provided by William Katt.
The Justice League version of Stewart appeared in several episodes of Static Shock, both as a member of the League and in a solo appearance. Phil LaMarr reprises his Justice League role as Green Lantern, as well as providing the voice for Static.
"The Call", a two-part episode of Batman Beyond, features a future Justice League that includes a Green Lantern who was an eight-year-old Asian child; he later appears as a young adult in the Justice League Unlimited episode "Epilogue". His name was Kai-ro, a tribute to Kairo, Green Lantern's alien sidekick on The Superman/Aquaman Hour of Adventure. Kai-ro is voiced by Lauren Tom.
Hal Jordan appears briefly in the Justice League Unlimited episode "The Once and Future Thing, Part 2: Time, Warped", voiced by Adam Baldwin. The time-traveling villain Chronos causes the timeline to become unstable, with characters changing or disappearing as their history is altered. At one point, Stewart morphs into Jordan, who aids the other characters for several minutes before changing back into Stewart.

Duck Dodgers
The Duck Dodgers episode "The Green Loontern" includes appearances by many members of the Green Lantern Corps. In this episode, a mixup at the dry cleaners results in Dodgers (Daffy Duck) getting Jordan's outfit and ring. Filmmaker and comics fan Kevin Smith provided the voice of Jordan for this cameo. Other Green Lanterns that appear in this episode are Kilowog (voiced by John DiMaggio), Katma Tui (voiced by Tara Strong), Boodikka (voiced by Grey DeLisle), Ch'p (voiced by Frank Welker), and Sinestro (voiced by John de Lancie), as well as nonspeaking appearances by Stewart, Arisia Rrab, G'nort, and Guy Gardner.

The Batman
In the fourth-season finale of The Batman, "The Joining", the Justice League is introduced. Hal Jordan is included among its members, in a non-speaking cameo. He next appears in the fifth-season episode "Ring Toss", voiced by Dermot Mulroney facing against Sinestro and again in the two-part series finale, "Lost Heroes".

Batman: The Brave and the Bold
Guy Gardner appears in multiple episodes of Batman: The Brave and the Bold, voiced by James Arnold Taylor. He appears briefly in the pre-title segment of "Day of the Dark Knight!", in which he ignores Batman's advice and accidentally frees an imprisoned alien by pouring coffee on him.

In the episode "The Eyes of Despero!", Gardner, G'nort, Sinestro and Mogo join forces with the Batman to stop the villain Despero from using his mental powers to turn the Green Lantern Corps into an army of mind controlled slaves. Other members of the Lantern Corps are seen, including Ch'p, Kilowog, Medphyll, and Hal Jordan. Jordan later makes a cameo appearance as a member of the original Justice League of America in "Sidekicks Assemble!", and is mentioned in "Darkseid Descending!" when Guy joins the Justice League International. A heroic version of Sinestro briefly appears "Deep Cover for Batman!", being held captive by the Injustice Syndicate. In this series, Hal is voiced by Loren Lester, Sinestro is voiced by Xander Berkeley, G'nort is voiced by Alexander Polinsky, and the Guardians are voiced by J. K. Simmons and Armin Shimerman. In the episode "Crisis: 22,300 Miles Above Earth!", Alan Scott, the original Green Lantern, appears as a member of the Justice Society of America. The JSA and the new Justice League International are meeting at a mixer on the Watchtower. The JSA is quickly disappointed when they learn they were not meeting the original Justice League which had broken up recently. Things get bad and both teams start fighting each other. Meanwhile, Batman is trying to stop Ra's Al Ghul from firing a fusion rocket into the sun triggering solar flares that will melt the polar ice caps and flood the planet. He sends a distress signal to the Watchtower and the two leagues stop fighting and team up to defeat Ra's. In this episode, he is voiced by Corey Burton.

Young Justice
Hal Jordan, John Stewart, Guy Gardner and Alan Scott appear in Young Justice. Jordan and Stewart appear as members of the Justice League, while Scott appears as a member of the Justice Society. Jordan and Stewart make their first appearances in the episode "Fireworks", Gardner appears in "Revelation" in a cameo to help the Justice League, and Scott appears in the episode "Humanity" in a flashback. None of them are voiced except for Stewart, who was voiced by Kevin Michael Richardson in the episode "Failsafe". In the episode "Agendas", Jordan and Stewart were convenes recruitment for the Justice League new members, both Jordan and Stewart immediately dismiss Gardner from the Flash's idea. However, Gardner would be later inducted to the Justice League sometime before the third season.

Green Lantern: The Animated Series
Hal Jordan appears as the main character in Green Lantern: The Animated Series, voiced by Josh Keaton. Other characters include Kilowog, the Guardians of the Universe, Carol Ferris, Salaak, Sayd, Saint Walker, and Zilius Zox, among others. The main antagonists of the first arc of the show are the Red Lantern Corps, led by Atrocitus, as well as the Manhunters. Guy Gardner appears as a recurring character while John Stewart is mentioned and Alan Scott is alluded to.

Mad
Both Hal Jordan and Kyle Rayner appear in Mad where they try to appeal to Superman, Batman, and Wonder Woman about being called "Super Friends".

DC Super Hero Girls
Hal Jordan appears in the web series DC Super Hero Girls as a student at Super Hero High, voiced again by Josh Keaton. Jessica Cruz is also featured in the series, voiced by Cristina Milizia.
Both Jessica Cruz and Hal Jordan appear in the 2019 TV series DC Super Hero Girls as Metropolis High School students. Jessica is voiced by Myrna Velasco and Hal is voiced by Jason Spisak.

Justice League Action
Hal Jordan appears in Justice League Action, with Josh Keaton reprising his role.

Live-action

Howard Murphy played Green Lantern in the live action Legends of the Superheroes TV specials in 1979. Sinestro was played by Charlie Callas.
The unsuccessful 1997 pilot for a live-action Justice League of America television series included Matthew Settle as Guy Gardner, although the pilot's Green Lantern uses only the name and costume of the comic book Gardner.
Alan Scott briefly appears in the Smallville episode "Absolute Justice" which featured the Justice Society of America. He is a superhero in the 1970s and a CEO of an unnamed broadcasting company, who was arrested for fraud by the government in a mission to take down the Justice Society of America. He, like the others, tried to take the blame for all crimes, though he and the rest were never convicted. As the law was now aware of his superhero identity, Scott retired from heroics. In 2010, Clark Kent and Chloe Sullivan find old black-and-white footage of Alan (his power ring is visible on his left hand), along with his criminal record. Very little is said about him, other than that he is the CEO of a broadcasting company, but it was confirmed that he was still alive by Stargirl and hinted at that he had children. His power ring and Lantern battery are later shown in a display case at the JSA Brownstone, as well as in his portrait in a JSA painting. Alan Scott is played by Doug Pinton. Subsequently, John Stewart and the Green Lantern Corps appear in the comic book continuation of the show.
Within the Arrowverse, there are several references and nods to the Green Lantern Corps and its related characters.
Arrow executive producer Marc Guggenheim tweeted a photo of Ferris Air with the slogan "We fly without Fear" as an easter egg of Green Lantern, with the location itself later showing up in the Arrow spin-off, The Flash. The series' star, Stephen Amell, has talked about seeing Green Lantern in the series. In the season 4 premiere episode, "Green Arrow", an aviator jacket with the name "Jordan" appears at a bar where Oliver Queen and Amanda Waller are seen discussing a mission along with a billboard proclaiming "In brightest day, In blackest night, Come to Coast City, When money's tight". Another nod takes place in the season seven episode, "Spartan", when Oliver's friend, John Diggle's stepfather's name is revealed as Roy Stewart (portrayed by Ernie Hudson). In the end of the series finale episode, "Fadeout", Diggle seemingly receives a power ring that falls from the sky.
In The Flash episode, "Rogue Air", the Flash himself mentions that Ferris Air shut down after one of their test pilots disappeared; alluding to Hal Jordan. In a later episode, "Welcome to Earth-2", the name "Hal" is seen on a list of contacts on a phone at Earth-2 Barry and Iris's home. In the episode, "Good-Bye Vibrations", Carrie Bates/Rainbow Raider 2.0 steals an air blimp from Ferris Air.
Alan Scott is mentioned in Legends of Tomorrow as the father of Obsidian (Todd Rice).
In the Elseworlds crossover event, Barry Allen of Earth-90 indicates that on his Earth, Diggle is a Green Lantern when he mistook Earth-1 Diggle for his version and asked him where his ring was.
During the Crisis on Infinite Earths crossover event, footage from the film Green Lantern was used to establish the existence of the Green Lantern Corps within the universe of Earth-12.
 Alan Scott appears in the DC Universe series Stargirl as a member of the Justice Society. Scott's daughter, Jennie makes her first live action appearance in season 2 portrayed by Ysa Penarejo.
 A live-action Green Lantern TV series is currently in the works for HBO Max. Initially Greg Berlanti was set to produce and Seth Grahame-Smith initially served as the showrunner and co-writer with Marc Guggenheim. The show was intended to focus on multiple human Green Lanterns such as Alan Scott (Jeremy Irvine), Guy Gardner (Finn Wittrock), Jessica Cruz, Simon Baz, Kilowog and other original characters. The show however underwent redevelopment in October 2022, with Grahame-Smith leaving the project and John Stewart becoming the central character. The series' title was revealed to be Lanterns in January 2023. The version with Berlanti was confirmed to have been cancelled, with this new series focusing on Stewart and Hal Jordan as part of DC Studios' new shared universe.

Films

Live action

Green Lantern

A live-action film titled Green Lantern starring Ryan Reynolds as Hal Jordan and directed by Martin Campbell was released on June 17, 2011. The film, being the character's first theatrical appearance, featured an origin story. The movie was neither well-received nor financially successful. Some of the film's most criticized aspects were the CGI elements that featured heavily.

DC Extended Universe

Justice League (2017)
Green Lantern Yalan Gur, appears in a flashback in Justice League (2017), during the sequence which depicts Mankind, Amazonians, Atlanteans, the Olympians and the Lantern fighting Steppenwolf and his army of Parademons. The Lantern conjures a giant hammer with their power ring to fight the armies of Apokolips, but is overpowered and killed by Steppenwolf. The power ring then leaves their finger and flies away to find a new worthy individual to inherit it.

Zack Snyder's Justice League (2021)

Director Zack Snyder confirmed on Christmas 2020, that in Zack Snyder's Justice League, Green Lantern is part of his Justice League and has confirmed Hal Jordan is "at another location" in response to a fan asking if Hal is at star labs or somewhere else, confirming Jordan's existence in his universe and possibly in the film. Kevin Smith confirmed in January 2019 that a scene was filmed in Principal Photography featuring a Green Lantern and Alfred at Bruce Wayne's lake house but was later reshot by Snyder with Superman. The latter version was included in the home release of Justice League as part of a deleted scene segment titled The Return of Superman. He also confirmed Green Lanterns and the Green Lantern Corps played a significant part in Snyder's planned Justice League trilogy and presumably the then planned Green Lantern Corps film, (see below), as before September 2017, it was planned to take place in Snyder's universe and meant to tie in to Snyder's planned Justice League trilogy. However, the failure of Justice League (2017) and success of Wonder Woman caused Warner Bros. to shift away from Snyder's vision. A scrapped credits scene featuring Kilowog and Tomar-Re visiting Bruce Wayne at his lake house in night was cut in post production in 2017. All of this was to set up Justice League sequels and the then planned Green Lantern Corps movie. Zack Snyder revealed he had planned for John Stewart to appear at the end of the film along with another Green Lantern, likely Kilowog and Tomar-Re. He said he filmed half of it back in 2016 during principal photography in London, with green lights shining on Alfred/Bruce. He intended to complete it as part of pick-ups shooting later in post-production but left the movie. When his movie got green lit, he finished shooting it with a theater actor Wayne T. Carr at Snyder's house on the driveway. The scene was later repurposed then to have both Stewart and Martian Manhunter talking to Bruce. However, Warner Bros. did not like the idea of Snyder introducing John Stewart as they have their own ideas for him elsewhere not connected to Snyder's universe. Thus, a compromise was made and Snyder repurposed the scene to feature Martian Manhunter, revealed earlier in the film to be General Calvin Swanwick, first introduced in Man of Steel, played by Harry Lennix. He visits Bruce Wayne at his lake house which was shot in late October 2020 during additional photography for the film. Snyder also revealed he had an early idea that an additional Lantern in that scene to be played by Ryan Reynolds, but scrapped it early on and never spoke to him about it.

Green Lantern Corps
A rebooted adaptation of the Green Lantern titled Green Lantern Corps is in development as a part of the DC Extended Universe, intended to be the tenth installment and involve the Green Lanterns as the main protagonists. The movie will reportedly feature numerous Green Lanterns, with a couple of them being from Earth as the main characters, specifically Hal Jordan and John Stewart. It was later stated that both of those characters, along with the Green Lantern Corps may appear in Justice League sequels. In January 2017, Deadline reported that David S. Goyer and Justin Rhodes were hired as co-screenwriters, with the story written by Goyer and Geoff Johns. Goyer will also produce the film with Johns and Jon Berg. In June 2018, Geoff Johns was hired to re-write the script, in addition to producing, with Johns stating that the script will draw inspiration from his New 52 run of the character. In July 2019, Christopher McQuarrie said that he had sent a proposal to Warner Bros. a year prior, which had ties to the Man of Steel sequel, but he moved onto other projects due to what he perceived as no progress on developing the film. By November 2019, Johns was expected to deliver his script by the end of that year. As of 2021, it seems the movie was reworked into the recently announced Green Lantern HBO Max series. On April 1, 2021, The Hollywood Reporter revealed the film is in development again at Warner Bros. John Stewart will be featured in it as confirmed by Zack Snyder who said he was forced by Warner Bros. to remove his own in-universe version of the character from his movie. It seems to be connected to the HBO Max series and is currently slated for a 2022–23 release.

Animation

Green Lantern animated films
Hal Jordan is the main protagonist in Green Lantern: First Flight, voiced by Christopher Meloni.
Hal Jordan appears in Green Lantern: Emerald Knights, voiced by Nathan Fillion.
John Stewart is the main protagonist in Green Lantern: Beware My Power, voiced by Aldis Hodge. Hal Jordan also appears, with Nolan North reprising his role.

Character in ensemble
Hal Jordan is one of the main characters in Justice League: The New Frontier, voiced by David Boreanaz.
Hal Jordan appears in Justice League: Crisis on Two Earths, voiced by Nolan North.
Hal Jordan appears as a member of the Justice League in Justice League: Doom, with Nathan Fillion reprising his role.
Nathan Fillion reprises his role as Hal Jordan in Justice League: The Flashpoint Paradox.
Hal Jordan appears in Lego Batman: The Movie – DC Super Heroes Unite, an adaptation of the video game of the same name, with Cam Clarke reprising his role.
Hal Jordan appears in Justice League: War, voiced by Justin Kirk.
Hal Jordan appears in The Lego Movie, voiced by Jonah Hill. In the film, there's a recurring joke where Green Lantern would find and try to help Superman, making the latter a little awkward. Superman even tries to commit suicide by asking for Kryptonite when he is put next to Green Lantern in the Torture Room.
Hal Jordan appears in Justice League: Throne of Atlantis, with Nathan Fillion reprising his role.
Guy Gardner appears in Lego DC Comics Super Heroes: Justice League vs. Bizarro League, with Diedrich Bader reprising his role.
Hal Jordan appears in Lego DC Comics Super Heroes: Justice League – Attack of the Legion of Doom, with Josh Keaton reprising his role.
Hal Jordan appears in Lego DC Comics Super Heroes: Justice League – Cosmic Clash, voiced again by Josh Keaton.
John Stewart appears in Justice League Dark, voiced by Roger Cross.
Hal Jordan appears as a member of the Justice League in The Lego Batman Movie, with Jonah Hill reprising his role. The film would mark Green Lantern's third theatrical appearance. In the film, he makes a brief cameo at the 57th Justice League anniversary and tells Batman that he hasn't received emails from Superman for years.
John Stewart appears as a member of the Justice League in Teen Titans Go! To the Movies, voiced by Lil Yachty.
Jessica Cruz appears in the animated film Lego DC Comics Super Heroes: Aquaman: Rage of Atlantis, with Cristina Milizia reprising her role.
Hal Jordan appears in The Death of Superman, with Nathan Fillion reprising his role.
Hal Jordan appears in Reign of the Supermen, once again voiced by Nathan Fillion.
Hal Jordan appears in The Lego Movie 2: The Second Part, with Jonah Hill reprising his role.
Jessica Cruz appears in Justice League vs. the Fatal Five, voiced by Diane Guerrero. Hal Jordan, John Stewart, Guy Gardner, and Kyle Rayner appear as holograms in the Legion's Clubhouse.
 The Green Lantern Corps appear in Justice League Dark: Apokolips War.
 John Stewart has a cameo appearance in Space Jam: A New Legacy. He is shown in the DC part of the Warner Bros. 3000 server-verse with other members of the Justice League after Superman stopped a runaway train that Daffy Duck caused.
 The Green Lanterns appear in Teen Titans Go! & DC Super Hero Girls: Mayhem in the Multiverse, where they are voiced again by Jason Spisak, Phil LaMarr and Myrna Velasco respectively.
 Jessica Cruz and Chip appear in DC League of Super-Pets, voiced by Dascha Polanco and Diego Luna, respectively.

Video games
The Emerald Twilight storyline was to be adapted into a video game for the Mega Drive and Super NES by Ocean Software. The game would have allowed players to assume the role of Kyle Rayner and take on the threat of Hal Jordan as Parallax. The game was cancelled.
John Stewart appears as a playable character in Justice League Heroes. Hal Jordan and Kyle Rayner are featured as unlockable characters.
John Stewart appears as a playable character in Justice League: Heroes United.
Hal Jordan appears as a playable character in Mortal Kombat vs. DC Universe. His special moves include a fist-shaped projectile, hammer constructs to smash foes, a large hand that slams foes to the ground, and a brick wall shield that absorbs projectiles. His heroic brutalities involve encasing the opponent in a force bubble and then rapidly contracting it, and crushing the opponent between two large hammers. In the game's trailer, Green Lantern is seen being beaten by Sonya Blade using martial arts and super strength before Captain Marvel saves him, and is seen defending a weakened Superman from Liu Kang (his counterpart from the Mortal Kombat Universe) in the Fortress of Solitude. Later, Sonya fights Green Lantern again and Green Lantern defeats Sonya Blade. He is also seen speaking with the Guardians of the Universe and being confronted by Lex Luthor, who is consumed by the "combat rage" and asserts that he deserves to have Hal's power ring.
Guy Gardner appears as a playable character in the Wii version of the Batman: The Brave and the Bold video game, with Hal Jordan being playable in the DS version. Arisia Rrab and Kilowog make appearances as well. Also, a statue of Alan Scott can be seen in the Gotham City level of the Wii version.
Hal Jordan appears in Green Lantern: Rise of the Manhunters, a video game based on the Green Lantern film.
Alan Scott, Hal Jordan, Guy Gardner, John Stewart, Kyle Rayner and Kilowog appear in DC Universe Online. John Stewart fights alongside the heroes against Sinestro and the Sinestro Corps, Hal Jordan and Green Arrow fight alongside the heroes against Eclipso and an out-of-control Spectre, Kilowog is the target of a bounty mission for villains and Kyle Rayner is a boss in the Coast City instance along with Amon Sur and Atrocitus. The player also helps Hal Jordan and Kilowog, along with other unnamed Green Lanterns in the Star Labs instance, which also includes Sinestro and Arkillo. The Corps is heavily involved in the entire "War of the Light" saga spread over several episodes, culminating in the final showdown against Nekron.
Hal Jordan appears as a playable character in Lego Batman 2: DC Super Heroes.
Hal Jordan appears as a playable character in Injustice: Gods Among Us, as both a Green Lantern and a Yellow Lantern. Yellow Lantern Hal Jordan is from a parallel Earth and fights for Superman's Regime, after becoming a member of the Sinestro Corps. Green Lantern Hal Jordan defeats both his counterpart and Sinestro on occasion and in the end they are forced to stand down when the heroic Superman defeats his villainous counterpart and his regime. Yellow Lantern and Sinestro are taken to Oa by Green Lantern to stand trial for their crimes. John Stewart and later a mobile version including Jessica Cruz are also featured as alternate skins.
Hal Jordan appears as a playable character in The Lego Movie Videogame.
Hal Jordan, Guy Gardner, John Stewart, Kyle Rayner, Kilowog and Duck Dodgers appear as playable characters in Lego Batman 3: Beyond Gotham.
Hal Jordan and two parallel Earth versions of him appear as playable characters in the multiplayer battle arena game Infinite Crisis, voiced by Adam Baldwin (Prime), Nolan North (Atomic), and JB Blanc (Arcane).
Hal Jordan appears as a playable character in Injustice 2. John Stewart is also featured as an alternate skin. In the game story, after being rehabilitated by the Guardians, Hal Jordan was able to reclaim his post as Green Lantern of Sector 2814. Now as an ally of Batman in the protection of the world, Hal is willing to prove to everyone (including himself) that he deserves a second chance. In his ending, after bringing Brainiac to Oa to stand trial, Hal learns that Sinestro has escaped imprisonment. Since the Green Lanterns are too weak from battling Superman's regime for a frontal assault, Hal agrees to go undercover as a Yellow Lantern, hoping that his willpower will be able to withstand the ring's addiction.
Hal Jordan, John Stewart, Jessica Cruz, Simon Baz and B'Dg are playable characters in Lego DC Super-Villains. However, Hal Jordan as Green Lantern got a DLC version based on his appearance in The Lego Movie 2: The Second Part.

Fine arts
In the fine arts, and starting with the Pop Art period and on a continuing basis since the 1960s, the character has been "appropriated" by multiple visual artists and incorporated into contemporary artwork, most notably by Mel Ramos, Dulce Pinzon, Lesya Guseva, Nate Gowdy, and others.

References